United Christian Academy is a private, non-denominational Christian school in the Inland Valley of Southern California on a  campus. The school is located in Rancho Cucamonga, California, on the campus of Abundant Living Family Church.  The school is a Kindergarten through 12th grade school focusing on Academic Excellence and Christian Character.

History
UC Academy was established in 1978 as a ministry of Upland First Church of the Nazarene, operating under the name “Ninth Street Christian School” and later as “Upland Christian Schools.” The school was originally located in Upland, California and only offered pre-school and elementary grades. A junior high school was added in 1992, and a high school was added in 1994.

In 2008, the Nazarene Church wanted to merge UC Academy with another school to form a large school district. Many in the school community believed that such a merger would cause UC to lose many of the strengths and distinct characteristics that make the school so special. One of those distinctives is keeping the school smaller so faculty and staff can have personal, nurturing relationships with individual students. A smaller school also affords more opportunities for students and parents to participate in the life and leadership of the school. Led by a group of dedicated parents, the school connected with Abundant Living Family Church (ALFC). ALFC graciously agreed to host the school on their new 30-acre campus in Rancho Cucamonga, California. With 350 students, the school re-constituted as an independent Christian school and began operating as “Upland Christian Academy” in 2009.

References

External links
United Christian Academy - Official Website

Christian schools in California
Private elementary schools in California
Private middle schools in California
Private high schools in California
Schools accredited by the Western Association of Schools and Colleges
1978 establishments in California